Serghei Namașco (born 19 June 1984) is a Moldovan football player. He currently is signed with FC Speranţa Crihana Veche. He can play as midfielder.

He has played 16 times for Moldova. He made his debut in a 1–1 draw against Malta.

His brother, Stanislav Namașco is currently playing for Kuban Krasnodar.

External links
Serghei Namașco player info at the official FC Tiraspol website

1984 births
Living people
Moldovan footballers
Moldova international footballers
Moldovan Super Liga players
FC Sheriff Tiraspol players
FC Tiraspol players
Association football midfielders
Association football forwards
FC Torpedo Moscow players
Expatriate footballers in Kazakhstan
Expatriate footballers in Russia
Moldovan expatriate sportspeople in Kazakhstan
FC Zimbru Chișinău players
FC Tighina players